Youness Rahimi (born 13 February 1995) is a Finnish football player who currently plays for the 2. divisjon side Brattvåg. Rahimi has also a dual Moroccan citizenship.

Career

Club
Rahimi made his league debut on 9 July 2012 against TPS. On 19 October 2012 he scored his first league goal against KuPS.

In December 2015, Rahimi signed with SJK.

He got his first stint abroad in May 2021 when he signed for Norwegian third-tier side Brattvåg IL.

International
Rahimi has represented Finland at youth and under-21 level.

Career statistics

Club

References

External links
 Profile at veikkausliiga.com 
 

1995 births
Living people
Finnish footballers
Finland youth international footballers
Finland under-21 international footballers
Veikkausliiga players
Finnish people of Moroccan descent
FC Honka players
Klubi 04 players
Pallohonka players
HIFK Fotboll players
Seinäjoen Jalkapallokerho players
FC Ilves players
Rovaniemen Palloseura players
Kakkonen players
Ykkönen players
Association football forwards
Finnish expatriate footballers
Expatriate footballers in Norway
Finnish expatriate sportspeople in Norway
Brattvåg IL players
Footballers from Helsinki